The Disney Family Singalong is a series of American music television specials that were broadcast by ABC in 2020. First aired on April 16, 2020, and all hosted by Ryan Seacrest, the specials featured performances of songs from Disney films by musicians and other celebrity guests from their respective homes. The performances featured on-screen karaoke lyrics, encouraging viewers to sing along.

The first special was seen by 10.3 million viewers. A second special—The Disney Family Singalong: Volume II—was aired on May 10, 2020, which was seen by 5.74 million viewers. This was followed by a Christmas-themed edition, The Disney Holiday Singalong, on November 30. The specials gained a spin-off in November 2021, The Queen Family Singalong, featuring similar performances of songs by British rock band Queen. Another spin-off titled Schoolhouse Rock! 50th Anniversary Singalong aired on February 1, 2023, featuring similar performances of songs from Schoolhouse Rock!

Production 
Produced by Done and Dusted, the special was first announced on April 10, 2020, for a premiere on April 16. It was produced in response to the COVID-19 pandemic in the United States, and as part of impact on television. The special would include public service announcements highlighting Feeding America's COVID-19 response, featuring various Walt Disney Television talent.

Kenny Ortega organized a cast reunion of High School Musical for the special, with a performance of "We're All In This Together". Ortega noted that the song had experienced a resurgence in popularity amid the pandemic (including videos of medical workers and others singing the song in support of their responses), explaining that "I can’t imagine that Matthew Gerrard and Robbie Nevil, who wrote this song, had any idea that it would have the legs and perhaps mean more now than when we first did it." The performance featured cast members from the film, as well as Raven-Symoné, and cast members from fellow Disney Channel films Descendants and Zombies, and the film's Disney+ spin-off High School Musical: The Musical: The Series. Zac Efron was unable to participate, but made a special guest appearance to introduce the performance.

Performances
{| class="wikitable plainrowheaders"
|+Performers & Songs featured on The Disney Family Singalong
|-
! scope="col"| Artist(s)
! scope="col"| Song(s)
! scope="col"| Film
|-
|-
| Derek HoughHayley ErbertJulianne Hough
| "Be Our Guest"
| Beauty and the Beast
|-
| Josh Groban and friends
| "You've Got a Friend in Me"
| Toy Story
|-
| Little Big Town and their respective children
| "A Spoonful of Sugar"
| Mary Poppins
|-
| Auliʻi Cravalho
| "How Far I'll Go"
| Moana
|-
| Beyoncé
| "When You Wish Upon a Star"
| Pinocchio
|-
| Amber Riley(introduced by her niece)
| "Let It Go"
| Frozen
|-
| Darren Criss
| "I Wan'na Be Like You"
| The Jungle Book
|-
| James Monroe IglehartThe cast of Aladdin
| "Friend Like Me"
| Aladdin
|-
| Ariana Grande
| "I Won't Say (I'm in Love)"
| Hercules
|-
| Bobby BonesCarrie Ann InabaErin AndrewsMarcus Scribner
| "The Bare Necessities"
| The Jungle Book
|-
| Josh GadLuke EvansAlan Menken
| "Gaston"
| Beauty and the Beast
|-
| Donny Osmond and his grandchildren
| "I'll Make a Man Out of You"
| Mulan
|-
| Christina Aguilera
| "Can You Feel the Love Tonight"
| The Lion King
|-
| Jordan Fisher and friends
| "Under the Sea"
| The Little Mermaid
|-
|Tori Kelly
|"Colors of the Wind"
|Pocahontas
|-
| John StamosCaitlin McHughBilly Stamos and friends
| "It's a Small World"
| Disneyland
|-
| Thomas Rhett
| "Do You Want to Build a Snowman?"
| Frozen
|-
| Kenny OrtegaRaven-SymonéCharli D'AmelioThe cast of High School MusicalVanessa HudgensAshley TisdaleMonique ColemanLucas GrabeelCorbin BleuKaycee StrohThe cast of DescendantsSofia CarsonDove CameronSarah JefferyBooboo StewartThe cast of ZombiesMilo ManheimMeg DonnellyThe cast of High School Musical: The Musical: The SeriesOlivia RodrigoJoshua BassettMatt CornettSofia WylieLarry SapersteinJulia LesterDara ReneéFrankie RodriguezJoe Serafini
| "We're All In This Together"
| High School Musical
|-
| Michael BubléDemi Lovato
| "A Dream Is a Wish Your Heart Makes"
| Cinderella
|-
| Various
| Thank You (sung to the tune of Heigh-Ho)
| Snow White and the Seven Dwarfs
|-
|}

Appearances

 Kristin Chenoweth
 Chris Harrison
 AJ Michalka
 Nathan Fillion
 Jaina Lee Ortiz
 Anthony Anderson
 Wendi McLendon-Covey
 Cobie Smulders
 Jimmy Kimmel
 Marcella Izaguirre
 Lionel Richie
 Robin Roberts
 Taran Killam
 Elle Fanning (introduced Ariana Grande)
 Tracee Ellis Ross (introduced Christina Aguilera)
 Zac Efron (introduced Kenny Ortega and the casts of High School Musical, Descendants, Zombies, and High School Musical: The Musical: The Series)
 Elizabeth Olsen
 Sebastian Stan
 Jeff Goldblum
 Paul Bettany
 Anthony Mackie
 Emily VanCamp
 Don Cheadle
 Raven-Symoné
 Charli D'Amelio

Broadcast
The special received 10.3 million viewers during its initial airing, making it the most-watched program of the evening. It also held a 2.6 share of the key demographic of adults 18-49, beating its nearest competitor Young Sheldon.

On April 24, 2020, an encore of the special on Disney Channel (accompanied by an airing of the sing-along version of High School Musical) drew 515,000 viewers.

On April 21, the special was made available for streaming on Disney+, before being removed exactly one year later.

Follow-ups

 Volume II 
On Mother's Day, May 10, 2020, ABC aired a follow-up special, The Disney Family Singalong: Volume II.Volume II was seen by 5.74 million viewers, with a 1.3 share among viewers 18-49; albeit lower than the initial special, it was still the highest-rated program of the night. The special served as a lead-in for that night's American Idol, which also featured Disney songs as a theme.

 Performances 

Appearances

 Kermit the Frog
 Miss Piggy
 The Muppets
 Tituss Burgess
 Chris Harrison
 Charlie Day
 Dan Orlovsky
 Edward James Olmos
 Gordon Ramsay
 Jason Schwartzman
 Jimmy Kimmel
 Katie Stevens
 Lionel Richie
 Michael Leaves
 Michael Strahan
 Morgan Freeman
 Nathan Fillion
 Robin Roberts
 RZA

 The Disney Holiday Singalong 

On November 30, 2020, ABC aired a third, Christmas-themed edition of the special, The Disney Holiday Singalong, as a lead-in for ABC's CMA Country Christmas'' special. The special was seen by 5.73 million total viewers, with a 1.3 share among viewers 18-49.

Performances

Appearances
 Kermit the Frog
 Miss Piggy
 Robin Roberts

Notes

References

External links
 
 
 

2020 television specials
April 2020 events in the United States
American Broadcasting Company television specials
Disney television specials
Responses to the COVID-19 pandemic in 2020
Sing-along television shows
Television shows about the COVID-19 pandemic
Television shows directed by Hamish Hamilton (director)